Petra Kvitová defeated Maria Sharapova in the final, 6–3, 6–4 to win the ladies' singles title at the 2011 Wimbledon Championships. It was her first major title. Kvitová became the first player born in the 1990s of either gender to win a major, the first Czech to win the title since Jana Novotná in 1998, and the first left-hander to win the title since Martina Navratilova in 1990.

Serena Williams was the two-time defending champion, but was defeated in the fourth round by Marion Bartoli. With the loss of Venus Williams in the fourth round, it guaranteed a first-time major finalist from the bottom half of the draw. For the first time since 1913, all eight quarterfinalists came from Europe. This also marked the first Wimbledon main draw appearance for future champion Simona Halep, who lost in the second round to Serena Williams.

Seeds

  Caroline Wozniacki (fourth round)
  Vera Zvonareva (third round)
  Li Na (second round)
  Victoria Azarenka (semifinals)
  Maria Sharapova (final)
  Francesca Schiavone (third round)
  Serena Williams (fourth round)
  Petra Kvitová (champion)
  Marion Bartoli (quarterfinals)
  Samantha Stosur (first round)
  Andrea Petkovic (third round)
  Svetlana Kuznetsova (third round)
  Agnieszka Radwańska (second round)
  Anastasia Pavlyuchenkova (second round)
  Jelena Janković (first round)
  Julia Görges (third round)

  Kaia Kanepi (first round)
  Ana Ivanovic (third round)
  Yanina Wickmayer (fourth round)
  Peng Shuai (fourth round)
  Flavia Pennetta (third round)
  Shahar Pe'er (first round)
  Venus Williams (fourth round)
  Dominika Cibulková (quarterfinals)
  Daniela Hantuchová (third round)
  Maria Kirilenko (third round)
  Jarmila Gajdošová (third round)
  Ekaterina Makarova (first round)
  Roberta Vinci (third round)
  Bethanie Mattek-Sands (first round)
  Lucie Šafářová (second round)
  Tsvetana Pironkova (quarterfinals)

Qualifying

Draw

Finals

Top half

Section 1

Section 2

Section 3

Section 4

Bottom half

Section 5

Section 6

Section 7

Section 8

Championship match statistics

References

External links

2011 Wimbledon Championships on WTAtennis.com
2011 Wimbledon Championships – Women's draws and results at the International Tennis Federation

Women's Singles
Wimbledon Championship by year – Women's singles
Wimbledon Championships
Wimbledon Championships